Quantic School of Business and Technology, also known as Quantic, is a private graduate business school based in Washington, D.C. Founded as Smartly Institute by Tom Adams in 2016, the school offers accredited executive degree programs through its proprietary mobile-first learning platform and is known for its unique pedagogy that uses gamified active learning methods.

The school is owned by its parent company Pedago.

Admission to Quantic's degree programs is one of the most selective in the United States with less than 13% acceptance rate. However, the school does not require standardized exams such as GRE or GMAT for admissions.

It currently offers two programs, the standard Master of Business Administration (MBA) and the Executive MBA (EMBA) for those with more than six years of professional experience.

Active learning
Quantic uses JetSet, an "interactive mobile university app" developed by its parent company Pedago. It uses "active learning" methodologies through interactive and gamified learning modules as alternative to video lectures. Succeeding modules are unlocked after completing tasks such as quizzes from its prerequisite courses. Students are graded numerically and requires a passing rate of at least 80% to complete a course. It also has machine-based tutoring that helps provide individualized feedback to students.

Accreditation
Quantic is the only degree-granting mobile-first graduate school in the world. It is licensed by the Office of the State Superintendent of Education in Washington, DC. It also received institutional accreditation from the Distance Education Accreditation Commission, a national accrediting agency recognized by the United States Department of Education. It is recognized by the Council for Higher Education Accreditation.

References

Educational institutions established in 2016
Private universities and colleges in Washington, D.C.